Cividate may refer to one of several towns/comunes in Italy:

Cividate Camuno, in the province of Brescia
Cividate al Piano, in the province of Bergamo